The Washington Education Association (WEA) is the statewide teachers' union for the state of Washington, United States. It was founded on April 2–3, 1889 as the Washington State Teachers Association. The WEA was the defendant in Davenport v. Washington Education Ass'n, a landmark public-sector union case decided by the Supreme Court of the United States.

References

External links
Washington Education Association official website

Trade unions in Washington (state)
1889 establishments in Washington (state)